Avazabad (also Romanized as ‘Avaẕābād) is a village in Qohab-e Sarsar Rural District, Amirabad District, Damghan County, Semnan Province, Iran. At the 2006 census, its population was 26, in 11 families.

References 

Populated places in Damghan County